Grinnell Mutual is a property-casualty mutual insurance company and reinsurer based in Grinnell, Iowa, United States.

Business performance 
Grinnell Mutual is the 107th largest property-casualty insurance company in the U.S. with policyholders in 12 states. Grinnell Mutual is the largest direct reinsurer of farm mutual companies in North America. With its member mutuals, it has over $1 Billion in combined written premium and $132 Billion insurance in force.

On January 27, 2021, AM Best issued an 'A' (Excellent) rating for financial strength and an 'a+' with a stable outlook long-term issuer credit rating for Grinnell Mutual. It has received an 'A' rating from AM Best since 1991. It has been a Property-Casualty Ward's 50 Company since 2016.

History 

In 1909, the company was formed in Greenfield, Iowa as "Iowa Farmers Mutual Reinsurance Association" by John Evans to provide reinsurance for county mutuals in Iowa. In 1933, the company moved to Grinnell, Iowa, and changed its name to "Farmers Mutual Reinsurance Association". The name changed again in 1948 to "Farmers Mutual Reinsurance Company". The current legal name, "Grinnell Mutual Reinsurance Company," was adopted in 1963. The company adopted the “Grinnell Mutual” and “Grinnell Re" brands in 2017.

In 2014, Grinnell Mutual was one of first six companies investing in the Global Insurance Accelerator, the first startup accelerator for insurtech.

In response to the COVID-19 pandemic, Grinnell Mutual announced the Trust in Tomorrow Premium Payback. This was one of a series of actions in March–May 2020 to assist policyholders affected by the pandemic, including moratoriums on policy cancellations and other actions to help both auto and commercial policyholders through this unsettled time.

Awards 

In addition to its 'A' rating from AM Best, Grinnell Mutual has been recognized as an Iowa Top Workplace since 2011.

Gallup recognized Grinnell Mutual with its 2021 Gallup Exceptional Workplace Award. The award recognizes the most engaged workplace cultures globally.

Forbes ranked Grinnell Mutual the fifth best Iowa employer in their inaugural list of America's Best-in-State Employers.

Firsthand (formerly Vault) has recognized Grinnell Mutual's co-op program as a Top 50 Internship since 2018. In 2020, Vault ranked Grinnell Mutual as the #2 best financial services internship, #3 best internship for real-life experience, and #4 best internship for overall career development.

Ward Group has recognized Grinnell Mutual as a Top 50 Property and Casualty Performer since 2016. Ward Group screens property-casualty insurance companies for safety, consistency, and achieving superior performance on equity, assets, total revenue, growth in revenue, growth in surplus, and combined ratio over a five-year period.

Valchoice named Grinnell Mutual a Best Car Insurance Company in six states: Minnesota, Nebraska, North Dakota, Ohio, South Dakota, and Wisconsin. Valchoice used data from state insurance commissioners, the National Association of Insurance Commissioners, AM Best Company, and S&P to determine their ratings.

Related Companies 
 Grinnell Compass — An auto insurance provider
 Grinnell Select — An auto insurance provider
 Grinnell Specialty Agency — Other lines of insurance

References

External links 
 
 
 A.M. Best Rating Services analysis
 Iowa Insurance Division Examination Report
 Iowa Insurance Division Market Conduct Examination Report

Financial services companies established in 1909
Companies based in Iowa
Economy of the Western United States
Insurance companies of the United States
Mutual insurance companies of the United States
Reinsurance companies
1909 establishments in the United States
American companies established in 1909